The John C. Schricker House is a historic building located in the West End of Davenport, Iowa, United States. It was individually listed on the National Register of Historic Places in 1983. The following year, it was included as contributing property in the Riverview Terrace Historic District.

John C. Schricker
John Schricker was a stone and marble contractor. His work included the Dillon Memorial in downtown Davenport and the Iowa Soldiers' and Sailors' Monument on the grounds of the Iowa State Capitol in Des Moines. Schricker became a partner along with Captain Chris Schricker and F.G. Roddler in the Davenport Pearl Button Company in 1895. The company made buttons from clam shells harvested from the Mississippi River. They remained in business until the 1930s. Schricker hired Davenport architect Gustav Hanssen, who was also responsible for the rectory at Sacred Heart Cathedral and the Central Fire Station, to design his house.

Architecture
The residence is a sophisticated example of the symmetrical Georgian Colonial Revival style. It features an elegant front porch held up with Doric columns and a veranda above. Paired pilasters frame the front porch and are capped with Ionic capitals. The tripartite articulation of the façade is somewhat unusual with its pedimented end bays. Double doors form the main entrance into the house and they are framed by side lights and a transom. Access to the veranda is through a rounded archway of brick.

See also
John Schricker House, Schricker's house built in 1910 that is also listed on the National Register of Historic Places.

References

Houses completed in 1896
Georgian Revival architecture in Iowa
Houses in Davenport, Iowa
Houses on the National Register of Historic Places in Iowa
National Register of Historic Places in Davenport, Iowa
Individually listed contributing properties to historic districts on the National Register in Iowa